Angie Fielder is an Australian film producer. She is best known for producing critically acclaimed film Lion (2016) that earned her Academy Award for Best Picture nomination with Emile Sherman and Iain Canning. 

She is a co-founder of production company Aquarius Films. 

She is co-producer of the 2021 comedy drama TV miniseries on SBS, The Unusual Suspects.

Filmography

References

External links
 

Living people
Australian film producers
Year of birth missing (living people)
Griffith Film School